Latton may refer to:
     
 Latton, Harlow, a village now situated in Harlow New Town, Essex, England
 Latton, a townland in Ireland, see List of townlands of County Monaghan
 Latton, Wiltshire, a village near Cricklade in Wiltshire, England